Alain Fuchs (born 10 April 1953) is a Swiss-born French Doctor of Science and chemistry Professor, specialized in molecular simulation. He served as the president of Chimie ParisTech - PSL from 2006 to 2010. He has served as the president of the French National Centre for Scientific Research from 2010 to 2017. He became an Officer of the Legion of Honour in 2014.

Since 24 October 2017, he is president of PSL University (Paris Sciences & Lettres).

Biography 
Alain Fuchs graduated as a Chemical engineer (1975) at EPFL. In 1983, he became a doctor in Physical Chemistry at Université Paris-Sud (now Paris-Saclay University; his dissertation was “Cristaux vitreux et transition vitreuse” (about glass crystals). He was also a postdoctoral fellow at the University of Edinburgh (1984–1985).

Career 
Alain Fuchs joined CNRS in 1985 as a research fellow. He became a research director in 1991. In 1995, he became chemistry professor at Université Paris-Sud. Between 2000 and 2005, he set up and directed the Laboratory of Physic Chemistry (UMR 8000) at Campus d'Orsay. He also worked as the President of the agrégation in chemistry from 1998 to 2001 and he directed the Section 13 of the Comité national de la recherche scientifique between 2004 and 2008. He was also Professor at the Université Pierre et Marie Curie (UPMC) in thermodynamics and statistical thermodynamics, intermolecular and surface forces, molecular simulation techniques, history of chemistry and physical chemistry. He served as the president of Chimie ParisTech from 2006 to 2010.

In January 2010, he was appointed President of the CNRS, succeeding Catherine Bréchignac (former President) d'Arnold Migus (former managing director). Fuchs’s mandate ended in 2014. After holding the position in interim for one month], he was appointed again by the Ministry of Higher Education.

In October 2017, Fuchs quit the position of CNRS President and became the President of Université PSL (collegiate university including 9 members and 10 associate members).

Fields of research 
His research activity is dedicated to the theory, modelling and molecular thermodynamics of fluids confined in various types of porous materials modeling and molecular simulation of confined fluids. “Forced intrusion of water and aqueous solutions in microporous materials: from fundamental thermodynamics to energy storage devices” (Chem. Soc. Rev.,46 (2017)) or “On the use of the IAST method for gas separation studies in porous materials with gate-opening behavior” (Adsorption, 24 (2018)) are part of his last recent and major publications.

Alain Fuchs is a member of the Academia Europaea and he was a member of the editorial board of the journal Physical Chemistry Chemical Physics.

He co-authored two books:

Major works

Honors and awards 
 Knight of Palmes académiques (1996)
 Fellow of the Royal Society of Chemistry (2006)
 Knight of the Légion d'honneur (2010)
 Officer of the National Order of Merit (2014)
 Officer of the National Order of Quebec (2014)

References

1953 births
Living people
People from Lausanne
Academic staff of the University of Paris
20th-century French chemists
Officiers of the Légion d'honneur
21st-century French chemists
Paris-Saclay University alumni
Research directors of the French National Centre for Scientific Research